Goniothalamus majestatis is a species of plant in the Annonaceae family. It is endemic to Sulawesi in Indonesia.

References

majestatis
Endemic flora of Sulawesi
Vulnerable plants
Taxonomy articles created by Polbot